The 2002–03 Dayton Flyers men's basketball team represented the University of Dayton during the 2002–03 NCAA Division I men's basketball season. The Flyers, led by ninth year head coach Oliver Purnell, played their home games at the University of Dayton Arena and were members of the Atlantic 10 Conference. They finished the season 24–6, 13–2 in A-10 play, with both losses coming to regular season champion Xavier. They won the program's first Atlantic 10 tournament title after defeating Temple in the championship game. Dayton received the A-10's automatic bid to the NCAA tournament where they were upset by Tulsa in the first round. Following the season, Purnell accepted the head coaching position at Clemson. He was replaced by Brian Gregory.

Previous season
The 2001-02 Dayton Flyers finished the season with an overall record of 21–12, with a record of 10–6 in the Atlantic 10 regular season. The Flyers fell to Xavier in the semifinals of the Atlantic 10 tournament. They received a bid to play in the NIT where they defeated Detroit in the opening round before falling to Tennessee Tech in the first round.

Offseason

Departures

Incoming transfers

Incoming recruits

Roster

Schedule

|-
!colspan=9 style="background:#C40023; color:#75B2DD;"| Non-conference regular season

|-
!colspan=9 style="background:#C40023; color:#75B2DD;"| Atlantic 10 regular season

|-
!colspan=9 style="background:#C40023; color:#75B2DD;"| Atlantic 10 tournament

|-
!colspan=9 style="background:#C40023; color:#75B2DD;"| NCAA tournament

References

Dayton Flyers men's basketball seasons
Dayton
Dayton
Dayton
Dayton